The Hooters Live is the first live album by American rock band the Hooters released in 1994 by MCA Records. It contains eleven tracks recorded live in Germany and two newly recorded studio tracks.

Background
The Hooters Live was recorded on December 2, 1993 at Biskuithalle in Bonn, Germany and December 3, 1993 at Hyde Park in Osnabrück, Germany.  There were two cover versions of Bob Dylan songs ("All I Really Want to Do" and "Blowin' in the Wind") recorded at the band's home studio The Ranch in Philadelphia, Pennsylvania in February 1994.

The album was released in Europe and Asia, but never saw a commercial release in the United States.

The album's package design and layout was done by band member Eric Bazilian on his home computer.

Track listing

Personnel
Adapted from the album liner notes.

The Hooters
Eric Bazilian – lead vocals, lead guitar, mandolin, recorder
Rob Hyman – lead vocals, keyboards, accordion
David Uosikkinen – drums
John Lilley – rhythm guitar, acoustic guitar, mandolin, keyboards, guitar solo on "Johnny B"
Fran Smith Jr. – bass, vocals
Mindy Jostyn – violin, harmonica, mandolin, vocals
Technical
Eric Bazilian – producer (all tracks), package design, layout
Rob Hyman – producer (all tracks)
Rick Chertoff – producer (studio tracks only)
Cedric Beatty – engineer (live tracks only) 
Norbert Gutzmann – second engineer (live tracks only) 
Stewart Lerman – engineer (studio tracks only)
William Wittman – mixing (at Studio 4, Philadelphia)
Dirk Grobelny – mixing assistant
George Marino – mastering (at Sterling Sound, NYC)
Stefan Wildhirt – band photography
Charles Grumbling – art production guru

References

The Hooters albums
Albums produced by Eric Bazilian
1994 live albums
MCA Records live albums
Albums produced by Rob Hyman
Albums produced by Rick Chertoff